Edward Pessen (1920–1992) was an American historian.

Life
Edeard Pessen was born to a working-class Jewish immigrant family in New York City. After army service Pessen completed undergraduate education (in 1947) and gained a PhD (in 1954) from Columbia University. He taught at several universities, ending as professor of history at the graduate school of the City University of New York. He was a founder of the Society for Historians of the Early American Republic, and was the society's president in 1985–6.

Works
 The social philosophies of early American leaders of labor, 1954
 Most uncommon Jacksonians: the radical leaders of the early labor movement, 1967
 New perspectives on Jacksonian parties and politics, 1969
 Jacksonian America: society, personality, and politics, 1969
 Riches, class, and power before the Civil War, 1973
 Three centuries of social mobility in America, 1974
 Jacksonian panorama, 1976
 The Many-faceted Jacksonian era: new interpretations, 1977
 The log cabin myth: the social backgrounds of the presidents, 1984

References

1920 births
1992 deaths
Graduate Center, CUNY faculty
20th-century  American historians
Columbia University alumni
United States Army personnel of World War II